Xelîl is a Kurdish name and surname, equivalent to the Arabic Khalil and its variants Khaleel, Khelil etc.

Xelîl may refer to:

Persons
Given name
Xelîl Duhokî (born 1951), also known as Khalil Duhoki, Iraqi-Kurdish writer, poet residing in Sweden
Xelîl Cindî Reşo (born 1952), also known as Khalil Rashow, Yazidi-Kurdish academic, writer and researcher

Surname
Têmûrê Xelîl (born 1949), Kurdish journalist, writer and translator

See also
Khalil (disambiguation)
Khalil (name)
Halil (disambiguation)